Hot Steel is a 1940 American film directed by Christy Cabanne and starring Richard Arlen, Andy Devine, and Peggy Moran.

Cast
Richard Arlen as Frank Stewart
Andy Devine as Matt Morrison 
Peggy Moran as Babe Morrison
Anne Nagel as Rita Martin
Donald Briggs as George Barnes
Joe Besser as Siggie Landers
James Flavin as Storm Swenson

References

External links
 
 

1940 films
American drama films
1940 drama films
American black-and-white films
1940s American films